The women's 220 yards event at the 1938 British Empire Games was held on 10 and 12 February at the Sydney Cricket Ground in Sydney, Australia.

Medalists

Results

Heats
Held on 10 February

Qualification: First 3 in each heat (Q) qualify directly for the semifinals.

Semifinals
Held on 10 February

Qualification: First 3 in each heat (Q) qualify directly for the final.

Final

Held on 12 February

References

Athletics at the 1938 British Empire Games
1938